Meharia is a genus of moths belonging to the family Cossidae.

Diagnosis
Meharia is distinguished from all other Cossidae genus by a number of apomorphous characters: the specific “tineoid appearance”, the reduction of the lateral processes of the juxta, the specific dorsolateral sclerotization of the asymmetric aedeagus and the specific ribbon – like epiphysis.

Description
These are small to medium-sized moths, females larger; eyes naked; male and female antennae bipectinate along their length; proboscis reduced; legs long, slender; foretibia bearing a ribbon-like epiphysis; forewing elongate, rounded on the outer margin; forewing pattern has alternate dark and pale spots and bands transversely; hindwing uniform.

Distribution
Eleven species have been reported so far, primarily from the deserts and arid mountains of the Western Palearctic and Africa.

Species
Meharia acuta Wiltshire, 1982
Meharia avicenna Yakovlev, 2011
Meharia baluchestana Alipanah & Yakovlev, 2021Meharia fischeri Yakovlev & Saldaitis, 2008Meharia hackeri Saldaitis, Ivinskis & Yakovlev, 2011Meharia incurvariella Chrétien, 1915Meharia incurvariella incurvariella Chrétien, 1915Meharia incurvariella persica (Wiltshire, 1946)Meharia murphyi  Yakovlev, 2013Meharia philbyi Bradley, 1952Meharia scythica D. Komarov et Zolotuhin, 2005Meharia semilactea (Warren et Rothschild, 1905)Meharia tancredii Sutton, 1963Meharia tanganyikae Bradley, 1952Meharia yakovlevi Saldaitis & Ivinskis, 2010

References
Cossidae of the Socotra Archipelago (Yemen)
 Yakovlev & Murphy, 2013. The Cossidae (Lepidoptera) of Malawi with descriptions of two new species''. Zootaxa 3709 (4): 371–393

 
Mehariinae
Cossidae genera